The League of Ireland First Division, also known as the SSE Airtricity League First Division for sponsorship reasons, is the second-highest division in both the League of Ireland and the Republic of Ireland football league system. The division was formed in 1985 as it replaced the League of Ireland B Division as the League of Ireland's second level division. Since 2003 the First Division has operated as a summer league. The division is contested by 10 clubs.

History

Inaugural season
In 1985 five teams – Bray Wanderers, Cobh Ramblers, Derry City, EMFA and Newcastle United – were elected to join the League of Ireland. All five subsequently participated in the inaugural 1985–86 First Division season, along with Monaghan United from the League of Ireland B Division and four clubs – Drogheda United, Finn Harps, Longford Town and Sligo Rovers – who were relegated following the 1984–85 League of Ireland season. Bray Wanderers were the inaugural First Division champions.

Europe
As a second level division, clubs playing in the First Division cannot qualify directly for Europe. However First Division clubs have qualified for Europe after winning the FAI Cup. In 1989–90 Bray Wanderers qualified for the 1990–91 European Cup Winners' Cup after winning the 1989–90 FAI Cup final. As a result, they became the first First Division team to play in Europe. In 1993–94 Sligo Rovers qualified for the 1994–95 European Cup Winners' Cup after winning the 1993–94 FAI Cup final. Rovers were also the 1993–94 First Division champions and were promoted to the 1994–95 Premier Division. As a result, they were actually a Premier Division club when they played in Europe. Bray Wanderers qualified for the 1999–2000 UEFA Cup after winning the 1999 FAI Cup Final. However, after finishing eleventh in the 1998–99 Premier Division, they were relegated to 1999–2000 First Division and as a result they were playing in the First Division when they subsequently embarked on their European campaign.

In 2009 Sporting Fingal qualified for the 2010–11 UEFA Europa League after winning the 2009 FAI Cup Final. They were also promoted to the 2010 Premier Division after winning the promotion/relegation play-off. In 2015 UCD qualified for the 2015–16 UEFA Europa League via the UEFA Respect Fair Play ranking system. After the FAI finished third in the 2014–15 rankings, they nominated UCD for the extra European place.

Promotion and relegation
A promotion and relegation system has existed between the League of Ireland Premier Division and the First Division since 1985–86. In 1992–93 a promotion/relegation play-off was also introduced. Between 2008 and 2011, A Championship teams were also eligible for promotion to the First Division. During this time both Mervue United and Salthill Devon were both promoted to the First Division from the A Championship. There is no formal promotion and relegation relationship between the First Division and the three third level provincial leagues – the Leinster Senior League Senior Division, the Munster Senior League and the Ulster Senior League. However provincial level teams have been invited to join the division. In 1990–91 St James's Gate were invited to join and in 1996–97 they were replaced by St Francis. In 2015, Cabinteely became the most recent team to accept an invite. All three clubs were recruited from the Leinster Senior League. Treaty Utd from the Munster senior league joined the first division in 2021, replacing Shamrock Rovers second team. Newly established Kerry FC were awarded their license in November 2022, confirming their place for the upcoming campaign.

2023 clubs

List of winners by season

List of winners by club

Top scorers

Notes

See also
 League of Ireland
 League of Ireland Premier Division
 Republic of Ireland football league system
 List of foreign League of Ireland players

References

External links
 
 Extratime.ie

 
1985 establishments in Ireland
2
2
Ireland
Sports leagues established in 1985
Summer association football leagues
Professional sports leagues in Ireland